The 2021 California Golden Bears football team represented the University of California, Berkeley during the 2021 NCAA Division I FBS football season. The team was led by head coach Justin Wilcox, in his fifth year. The team played their home games at California Memorial Stadium as a member of the North Division of the Pac-12 Conference.

Schedule

Schedule Sources:

Game summaries

vs Nevada

at TCU

vs Sacramento State

at Washington

vs Washington State
 Homecoming Game

at No. 9 Oregon

vs Colorado

vs Oregon State

at Arizona

at Stanford

at UCLA

vs USC

Rankings

References

California
California Golden Bears football seasons
California Golden Bears football